Aleksandr Vasilyevich Molodtsov (born 1 March 1962) is a former Russian professional footballer.

Club career
He made his professional debut in the Soviet Top League in 1980 for FC Dynamo Moscow.

Honours
 Soviet Cup winner: 1984.
 Soviet Top League runner-up: 1986.

European club competitions
With FC Dynamo Moscow.

 UEFA Cup 1982–83: 2 games.
 European Cup Winners' Cup 1984–85: 3 games.

References

1962 births
Footballers from Moscow
Living people
Russian footballers
Soviet footballers
Soviet Top League players
FC Dynamo Moscow players
FC Metalurh Zaporizhzhia players
FC Shinnik Yaroslavl players
FC Fakel Voronezh players
FC Volgar Astrakhan players
Association football midfielders
FC Spartak Kostroma players